Bacterial anoxygenic photosynthesis differs from the better known oxygenic photosynthesis in plants by the reductant used (e.g. hydrogen sulfide instead of water) and the byproduct generated (e.g. elemental sulfur instead of molecular oxygen).

Bacteria and archaea
Several groups of bacteria can conduct anoxygenic photosynthesis: green sulfur bacteria (GSB), red and green filamentous phototrophs (FAPs e.g. Chloroflexia), purple bacteria, acidobacteriota, and heliobacteria.

Some archaea (e.g. Halobacterium) capture light energy for metabolic function and are thus phototrophic but none are known to "fix" carbon (i.e. be photosynthetic). Instead of a chlorophyll-type receptor and electron transport chain, proteins such as halorhodopsin capture light energy with the aid of diterpenes to move ions against a gradient and produce ATP via chemiosmosis in the manner of mitochondria.

Pigments
The pigments used to carry out anaerobic photosynthesis are similar to chlorophyll but differ in molecular detail and peak wavelength of light absorbed. Bacteriochlorophylls a through g absorb electromagnetic radiation maximally in the near-infrared within their natural membrane milieu. This differs from chlorophyll a, the predominant plant and cyanobacteria pigment, which has peak absorption wavelength approximately 100 nanometers shorter (in the red portion of the visible spectrum).

Reaction centers
There are two main types of anaerobic photosynthetic electron transport chains in bacteria. The type I reaction centers are found in GSB, Chloracidobacterium, and Heliobacteria, while the type II reaction centers are found in FAPs and purple bacteria.

Type I reaction centers

The electron transport chain of green sulfur bacteria — such as is present in the model organism Chlorobaculum tepidum — uses the reaction center bacteriochlorophyll pair, P840. When light is absorbed by the reaction center, P840 enters an excited state with a large negative reduction potential, and so readily donates the electron to bacteriochlorophyll 663, which passes it on down an electron transport chain. The electron is transferred through a series of electron carriers and complexes until it is used to reduce NAD+ to NADH. P840 regeneration is accomplished with the oxidation of a sulfide ion from hydrogen sulfide (or of hydrogen or ferrous iron) by cytochrome c555.

Type II reaction centers

Although the type II reaction centers are structurally and sequentially analogous to Photosystem II (PSII) in plant chloroplasts and cyanobacteria, known organisms that exhibit anoxygenic photosynthesis do not have a region analogous to the oxygen-evolving complex of PSII.

The electron transport chain of purple non-sulfur bacteria begins when the reaction center bacteriochlorophyll pair, P870, becomes excited from the absorption of light. Excited P870 will then donate an electron to bacteriopheophytin, which then passes it on to a series of electron carriers down the electron chain. In the process, it will generate an electrochemical gradient which can then be used to synthesize ATP by chemiosmosis. P870 has to be regenerated (reduced) to be available again for a photon reaching the reaction-center to start the process anew. Molecular hydrogen in the bacterial environment is the usual electron donor.

References

Photosynthesis